Robert Joseph Plomin  (born 1948) is an American/British psychologist and geneticist best known for his work in twin studies and behavior genetics. A Review of General Psychology survey, published in 2002, ranked Plomin as the 71st most cited psychologist of the 20th century. He is the author of several books on genetics and psychology.

Biography 
Plomin was born in Chicago to a family of Polish-German extraction. He graduated high school from DePaul University Academy in Chicago, he then earned a B.A. in psychology from DePaul University in 1970 and a Ph.D. in psychology in 1974 from the University of Texas at Austin under personality psychologist Arnold H. Buss. He then worked at the Institute for Behavioral Genetics at the University of Colorado Boulder. From 1986 until 1994 he worked at Pennsylvania State University, studying elderly twins reared apart and twins reared together to study aging and since 1994 has been at the Institute of Psychiatry (King's College London). He has been president of the Behavior Genetics Association.

In 1987 Plomin married Judith Dunn, a British psychologist and academic.

Honors and awards
In 2002, the Behavior Genetics Association awarded him the Dobzhansky Memorial Award for a Lifetime of Outstanding Scholarship in Behavior Genetics. He was awarded the William James Fellow Award by the Association for Psychological Science in 2004 and the 2011 Lifetime Achievement Award of the International Society for Intelligence Research. In 2017, Plomin received the APA Award for Distinguished Scientific Contributions.  Plomin was ranked among the 100 most eminent psychologists in the history of science. In 2005, he was elected a Fellow of the British Academy (FBA), the United Kingdom's national academy for humanities and social sciences.

Plomin was appointed Commander of the Order of the British Empire (CBE) in the 2023 New Year Honours for services to scientific research.

Research 

Plomin has shown the importance of non-shared environment, a term that he coined to refer to the idiosyncratic environmental factors that reduce the similarity of individuals raised in the same family environment. In addition, he has shown that many environmental measures in psychology show genetic influence and that genetic factors can mediate associations between environmental measures and developmental outcomes.

Plomin currently conducts the Twins Early Development Study of all twins born in England from 1994 to 1996, focusing on developmental delays in early childhood, their association with behavioural problems and educational attainment.

In 1994 he was one of 52 signatories on "Mainstream Science on Intelligence", an editorial written by Linda Gottfredson and published in the Wall Street Journal, which declared the consensus of the signing scholars on issues related to intelligence research following the publication of the book The Bell Curve.

Bibliography
Behavioral Genetics: A Primer, together with John C. DeFries, Gerald E. McClearn, WH Freeman & Co, 1989, 
Separate Lives: Why Siblings Are So Different, together with Judy Dunn, Basic Books, 1992, 
Behavioral Genetics in the Postgenomic Era, together with John C. DeFries, Peter McGuffin, Ian W. Craig, American Psychological Association, 2002, 
The Relationship Code: Deciphering Genetic and Social Influences on Adolescent Development (Adolescent Lives), together with David Reiss, Jenae M. Neiderhiser, E. Mavis Hetherington, Harvard University Press, 2003, 
Nature, Nurture, and the Transition to Early Adolescence, together with John C. DeFries, Stephen A. Petrill, John K. Hewitt, Oxford University Press, 2003, 
Nature And Nurture: An Introduction To Human Behavioral Genetics, Wadsworth Publishing, 2004, 
Nature and Nurture during Infancy and Early Childhood, together with John C. DeFries, David Fulker, Cambridge University Press, 2006, 
Behavioral Genetics, together with John C. DeFries, Peter McGuffin, Gerald E. McClearn, Worth Publishers; 5th edition, 2008, 
Behavioral Genetics, together with John C. DeFries, Valerie S Knopik, Jenae M. Neiderhiser, Worth Publishers; 6th edition, 2012, 
G Is for Genes, together with Kathryn Ashbury, Wiley Blackwell; 2013, 
Behavioral Genetics, together with John C. DeFries, Valerie S Knopik, Jenae M. Neiderhiser, Worth Publishers; 7th edition, 2016, 
Blueprint: How DNA Makes Us Who We Are, Penguin Books Ltd., 2018,

References

External links

Robert Plomin Interview with David Lubinski

1948 births
Living people
Academics of King's College London
21st-century American psychologists
Behavior geneticists
DePaul University alumni
Fellows of King's College London
Fellows of the British Academy
Intelligence researchers
Pennsylvania State University faculty
Race and intelligence controversy
University of Texas at Austin College of Liberal Arts alumni
University of Colorado faculty
Personality psychologists
People from Chicago
Commanders of the Order of the British Empire
American emigrants to England
Naturalised citizens of the United Kingdom
20th-century American psychologists